Rita Nasirumbi is a Ugandan airline transport pilot, who serves as a First Officer at Uganda National Airlines Company, Uganda's national carrier airline, on the CRJ 900 aircraft, effective April 2019.

Career
In April 2019, she was hired by Uganda National Airlines Company, as one of a small number of female pilots at the airline.

See also
 Tina Drazu
 Vanita Kayiwa
 Michael Etyang

References

External links
 UTB ready to work with Uganda Airlines to promote country – Ajarova As of 23 April 2019.
 Uganda Airlines; Pitfalls To Avoid As of 17 May 2019.

Living people
Year of birth missing (living people)
Ugandan aviators
Women aviators
People from Eastern Region, Uganda
Commercial aviators
Women commercial aviators